The FT Adler Kiel Rugby is a German rugby union club from Kiel, currently playing in the 2nd Rugby-Bundesliga North/East. It is part of a larger club, the FT Adler Kiel, which also offers other sports like volleyball, table tennis and handball.

The term Adler is the German word for eagle.

History

Origins
Kiel rugby began in the 1930s, when the local shipyards workers and German Navy members, then called the Reichsmarine,  formed the 1. Kieler Rugby Fussball Verein.

In post-Second World War Germany, competitive rugby in Kiel resumed in 1949, when three local clubs competed in a league with clubs from Hamburg. The three clubs were the 1. Kieler Rugby Fussball Verein, PSV Kiel and FT Adler. Rugby in Kiel greatly benefited from a strong support through the British Army, which was stationed at Kiel-Holtenau.

Towards the end of the 1950s, Kiel rugby declined and the clubs were only able to field a combined team. In 1963, even this team had to be disbanded. As a form of farewell to rugby in Kiel, a final friendly match was organized. The match was against a team selected from a visiting detachment of the Japanese Navy. After this, rugby disappeared from the city for almost 30 years.

Current club
Rugby returned to Kiel in the late 1980s through the efforts of foreign students at the University of Kiel. The current rugby department of FT Adler was formed in 1997 however.

FT Adler took out the 2008 championship in the Regionalliga North but failed in the promotion round, losing on aggregate to RU Hohen Neuendorf.

The club earned promotion from the Rugby-Regionalliga North, after another championship there, to the 2nd Rugby-Bundesliga, the second tier of German club rugby, in 2009.

Kiel lasted for only one season at this level before being relegated again to the Regionalliga, where it came fourth in 2010-11. At the end of the 2014–15 season the club was promoted back to the 2nd Rugby-Bundesliga after a Regionalliga championship.

Club honours
 Rugby-Regionalliga North
 Champions: 2008, 2009, 2015

Recent seasons
Recent seasons of the club:

References

External links

  Official website
  Official website of the rugby department
  FT Adler Kiel club info at totalrugby.de

German rugby union clubs
Sports clubs established in 1893
Rugby clubs established in 1999
Rugby union in Schleswig-Holstein
1999 establishments in Germany